Ethel Hobday, née Sharpe (28 November 1872, Dublin – 10 July 1947, Tankerton) was an Irish pianist, who became famous in chamber-music recitals especially in England, and was married to the violist Alfred Charles Hobday.

Ethel Sharpe was a pupil at the Royal Irish Academy of Music. She then went on to study at the Royal College of Music in London, under Franklin Taylor. She gave her first recital in the Prince's Hall, London in November 1891. She received the silver medal of the Musicians' Company. In 1894 she gave a recital in Vienna, but reappeared in London in 1895.

Following marriage to Alfred Hobday, she became known as Ethel Hobday, and took part in early recordings of full-length chamber-works (Brahms and Elgar Quintets) with the London Quartet and the Spencer Dyke Quartet. She is the accompanist to violinist Albert Sammons and violist Lionel Tertis in many early recordings.

Alfred Hobday died in 1942. Ethel Hobday died 10 July 1947.

References 

A. Eaglefield-Hull, A Dictionary of Modern Music and Musicians (Dent, London 1924).

Musicians from Dublin (city)
1872 births
1947 deaths
Alumni of the Royal Irish Academy of Music
Irish pianists
19th-century pianists
20th-century Irish pianists